Geoffrey Coates may refer to:
Geoffrey E. Coates (1917–2013), British chemist
Geoffrey W. Coates (born 1966), American chemist